Osceola Township is a township in Clarke County, Iowa, USA.  As of the 2000 census, its population was 481.

Geography
According to the USGS, it contains one cemetery, Maple Hill.

Transportation
Osceola Township contains one airport or landing strip, Osceola Municipal Airport.

References
 USGS Geographic Names Information System (GNIS)

External links
 US-Counties.com
 City-Data.com

Townships in Clarke County, Iowa
Townships in Iowa